Hua is a common transliteration for some Chinese surnames, of which the most common ones are 華/华 and 花. The Cantonese romanizations for 華 and 花 are Wah and Fa, respectively. 華, when pronounced in the fourth tone in Mandarin, is exclusively used in the name of Mount Hua and as a surname. The usual pronunciation of 華 is huá, which literally means "prosper" and is used as a reference to the Chinese people. On the other hand, 花 literally means "flower".

Huà (华 / 華)
It is listed 28th on the Song dynasty-era Hundred Family Surnames.
Hua Gang, Chinese educator.
Hua Guofeng, Chinese politician, born as Su Zhu.
Hua Jianmin, Chinese politician.
Hua Luogeng, Chinese mathematician.
Hua Sui (1439–1513), Chinese scholar and printer.
Hua Tuo (140-208), Chinese physician.
Hua Xin (157–231), former official of Sun Quan and Minister of Cao Wei
Hua Xiong (died 191), general under Warlord Dong Zhuo.
Hua Yanjun (1893–1950), Chinese musician, also known as "Abing".
Hua Chenyu, Chinese singer and songwriter.

Huā (花)
It is the 55th name on the Hundred Family Surnames poem. 

Hua Mulan, ancient Chinese legendary woman warrior.
 According to History of Ming, her family name is Zhu (朱), while the History of Qing says it is Wei (魏). 
Hua Rong, fictional character in Water Margin.
Hua Qianfang (花千芳), writer, social commentator.

References

Chinese-language surnames
Multiple Chinese surnames